The 22317 / 22318 Sealdah - Jammu Tawi Humsafar Express is a superfast express train belonging to Eastern Railway zone that runs between  and  in India. It was announced to be operated with 22317/22318 train numbers on a weekly basis. Its inaugural run took place on 4 July 2018.

Coach Composition 

The composition is yet to be announced but usually Humsafar Express trains are operated with only 3-Tier AC sleeper coaches with LED screens to display information about stations, train speed etc. and will have announcement system as well, Vending machines for tea, coffee and milk, Bio toilets in compartments as well as CCTV cameras.

Service

The 22317 Sealdah - Jammu Tawi Humsafar Express is scheduled to leave  at 13:10 on Mondays and reach  at 23:30 on Tuesday. The 22318 Jammu Tawi – Sealdah Humsafar Express leaves  at 07:25 on Wednesdays and reaches the destination at 18:05 on Thursday.

Traction
Both trains are hauled by a Howrah based WAP 7 locomotive from end to end.

Route & Halts 
The stoppages are:-

 
 
 
 Gaya

See also 

 Humsafar Express

Notes

References

External links 

Humsafar Express trains
Transport in Kolkata
Transport in Jammu
Rail transport in West Bengal
Rail transport in Jharkhand
Rail transport in Bihar
Rail transport in Uttar Pradesh
Rail transport in Haryana
Rail transport in Punjab, India
Rail transport in Jammu and Kashmir
Railway services introduced in 2018